Eyton may refer to:

Eyton, Herefordshire, a civil parish in Herefordshire, England
Eyton on Severn, a village in Shropshire, England
Eyton upon the Weald Moors, a civil parish in Shropshire, England
Eyton (surname)